Governance in higher education is the means by which institutions for higher education (tertiary or post-secondary education) are formally organized and managed (though often there is a distinction between definitions of management and governance). Simply, university governance is the way in which universities are operated.  Governing structures for higher education are highly differentiated throughout the world, but the different models nonetheless share a common heritage. Internationally, tertiary education includes private not-for-profit, private for-profit, and public institutions governed by differentiated structures of management.

Governance and management of post-secondary institutions becomes even more diverse with the differences in defining the relationships between higher and tertiary education (university education), postsecondary education, technical and vocational education, and community college models of education.  The issues are complicated by current debates over collegial and shared forms of governance contrasted to corporate and business forms of institutional governance.

Governance

The concept of governance in postsecondary education predominantly refers to the internal structure, organization and management of autonomous institutions.  The internal governance organization typically consists of a governing board (board of regents, board of directors), the university president (executive head, CEO) with a team of administrative chancellors and staff, faculty senates, academic deans, department chairs, and usually some form of organization for student representation.  In the United States, state institution governing boards often emphasize the concept of citizen governance in recognizing that board members serve a civic role for the institution.  Management structures themselves have become increasingly complex due to the increasing complexity of intraorganizational, interorganizational and governmental relationships.  Whether college and university education, adult education, technical or vocational education, educational administration presents complex challenges at all levels of private and public education.

"Governance" is defined by Kezar and Eckel as the macro-level of policy decision making.  Kezar and Eckel suggest governance is a multi-level concept including several different bodies and processes with different decision-making functions.  In this way, governance is sometimes defined at difference to the internal management of institutions.  Throughout the world, many national, state and local governments have begun to establish coordinating and governing boards as both buffer and bridge to coordinate governance and institutional management.

Due to the influences of public sector reforms, several authors (Kezar and Eckel 2004; Lapworth 2004; Middlehurst 2004) point out that next to the concept of shared and participative governance a new form of governance has emerged. According to Lapworth, the rise of the notion of corporate governance and the decline of the shared or consensual governance can be seen to be a result of the decline in academic participation, a growing tendency towards managerialism and the new environment where the universities are operating.

University governance varies between countries. McMaster notes the different cultures in universities and the traditional relationships between faculty and administration, characterizing historical transitions and suggesting that universities today are undergoing transitions in culture.  Kezar and Eckel point out the substance of governance has changed during the last decades with more emphasis put on high stake issues and more incremental decisions made in a less collegial mode – the reasons for this stem from trends that have devalued the notion of participation and also from the external pressures for more accountability and demands for quicker decision-making (that sometimes is achieved through bureaucracy).  McMaster discusses the same changes in university management resulting from the “huge amount of additional administrative work at all levels within the university, and the requirement for a wide range of specialist skills in areas such as marketing, HR management, management accounting, web development and instructional design” and the difficulties with the tensions that have resulted between collegial and corporate models of management.

Dearlove emphasises that, under the conditions of mass higher education, no university can avoid the need for some sort of bureaucratic management and organisation, though this does not mean that the importance of informal discipline and profession-based authority (internal governance of universities) can totally be ignored.  Lapworth advocates what the author believes is a model of university governance with the positive aspects of corporate and collegial approaches.  The issues in university governance discussed by these literatures are detailed by Coaldrake, Stedman, and Little (2003) through a comparative study of current trends in Australia, the United Kingdom, and the United States, with poignant insight into the different models of governance for the management of higher education. Critical of the currents of change toward “corporate governance,” the authors cite reference to literature that calls for “re-balancing” of university governance, maintaining that the re-balancing “would amount to a clarification of shared governance”.  With changing roles in human resources and the external pressures for accountability affecting university relationships internally, McMaster provides insights by defining management styles in terms of nested partnership between faculty and administration, contiguous partnership, and segmented partnership.  With debates over the recent trends, university organizations, governing associations, and numerous postsecondary institutions themselves have set forth policy statements on governance.

United States
Within the US, governance varies greatly from university to university. Without any policy, various statements have been influential.

American Association of University Professors
The American Association of University Professors (AAUP) was the first organization to formulate a statement on the governance of higher education based on principles of democratic values and participation (which, in this sense, correlates with the Yale Report of 1828, which has been referred to as the “first attempt at a formally stated philosophy of education” for universities, emphasizing at that time that Enlightenment curricula following the establishment of democratic constitutional governance should not be replaced with retrogression to religious curricula). The AAUP published its first "Statement on Government of Colleges and Universities" in 1920, “emphasizing the importance of faculty involvement in personnel decisions, selection of administrators, preparation of the budget, and determination of educational policies.  Refinements to the statement were introduced in subsequent years, culminating in the 1966 Statement on Government of Colleges and Universities.  The document does not provide for a “blueprint” for the governance of higher education. Nor was the purpose of the statement to provide principles for relations with industry and government (though it establishes direction on “the correction of existing weaknesses”).  Rather, it aimed to establish a shared vision for the internal governance of institutions.  Student involvement is not addressed in detail.  The statement concerns general education policy and internal operations with an overview of the formal structures for organization and management.  In process and structure, the meaning with the end result is an organizational philosophy for shared governance in higher education.

National Education Association
First published in 1987, the National Education Association (NEA) statement on faculty governance in higher education is a straightforward point of view on their policy in support of shared governance.  The policy maintains that faculty involvement in governance is critical.  Providing research support, the organization states faculty should advise administration in developing curriculum and methods of instruction.  Faculty is responsible for establishing degree requirements, takes primary responsibility in tenure appointments and the award of promotion and sabbatical.  Addressing issues through collective bargaining, the statement believes “administration and the governing boards of colleges and universities should accept the faculty's recommendations”.  The statement also maintains that faculty should be involved in salary decisions, evaluating administrators, and budgeting.  The policy concludes with the assertion:
 State and federal government and external agencies should refrain from intervening in the internal governance of institutions of higher education when they are functioning in accordance with state and federal law. Government should recognize that conserving the autonomy of these institutions is essential to protecting academic freedom, the advance of knowledge, and the pursuit of truth. 

The policy statement references the AAUP's "1966 Statement on Government of Colleges and Universities."  The basic principles evidently draw from the early AAUP statement on governance.  Though the NEA makes no mention of students anywhere in the policy, the NEA like the AAUP does reflect the basic ideas and premise for the “responsibility primarily of the faculty to determine the appropriate curriculum and procedures of student instruction”.  In this respect, the AAUP grants that considerations should be made for publicly supported institutions.  Unlike the NEA, the AAUP elaborates more on the role of governing structures, including the role of the president to ensure "sound academic practices", as the NEA suggests faculty rights to appeal flawed and improper procedures. In summation, where the AAUP discusses the organizational structure for governance and management in more detail while touching on student involvement, the NEA statement differs by detailing primarily faculty rights and responsibilities in shared governance.

Statement of community college governance
Following on the 1987 publication of "Policy Statement on Higher Education Faculty Governance", in 1989 the NEA issued a "Policy Statement on Higher Education Policy for Community College Governance."  The NEA elaborates upon issues in support of shared governance for the management of community colleges, junior and technical colleges not addressed in their previous statement.  The statement is based on the same principles, believing cooperative decision-making and collective bargaining in governance should be based on “collegial” relationships.  Where statements from the NEA and the AAUP advocate the importance of faculty involvement in governance, the community college statement notes that many do not exercise the right when available and that faculty “at public institutions are not yet permitted to bargain collectively in many states”.  The NEA then elaborates upon the need for faculty participation.

Again, the "Policy Statement of Community College Governance" correlates based upon the same underlying principles of the AAUP and NEA statement on faculty governance.  The community college statement also elaborates upon structure and procedure not addressed in the previous statement, including the “ad hoc” and standing committees as discussed in the AAUP policy statement on governance.  Where the AAUP statement discusses policy on students and their academic rights, with the community college statement the NEA does not address student involvement.

American Federation of Teachers
In 2002, the Higher Education Program and Policy Council of the American Federation of Teachers (AFT) published a statement in support of the shared governance of institutions.  The policy statement is a response to the fact that many governing boards have adopted the "mantra of business”.  The AFT iterates the purpose by which higher education achieves democratic organizational processes between administration and faculty, believing shared governance is under attack in six ways:
 the outsourcing of instruction, particularly to learning technologies;
 redirecting teaching to part-time and temporary faculty;
 re-orienting curriculum to business oriented coursework;
 the buying and selling of courseware for commercial exploitation;
 for profit teaching and research;
 with the formation of a “commercial consortia with other universities and private investors."  Meaning, as many have begun to view education as business, they are not necessarily in the business of education.

Accordingly, six principles affirm standards of academic freedom, faculty participation in standards and curriculum, and faculty decisions on academic personnel as the AAUP first established principles of governance.  The statement maintains that participation in shared governance should be extended, acknowledging that the way in which participation is expanded will vary from institution to institution; “but each group whose work contributes to the academic enterprise should be involved in a manner appropriate to institutional functions and responsibility”.  The policy addresses unions and faculty senates, believing that they contribute to the maintenance of shared governance in institutions as well as the role of accrediting agencies to support management standards.  In conclusion, the AFT emphasizes affirmation of the goals, objectives and purpose for shared governance in higher education.

Association of Governing Boards
With recent debates and trends in the governance of institutions of higher education in the United States, the Association of Governing Boards of Universities and Colleges (AGB) issued a statement on governance, most recently updated in 2010.  The original statement was published with a correlating statement, “Governing in the Public Trust:  External Influences on Colleges and Universities.”  In the first statement on governance, the advisiory organization for institutional governance discusses facts and perceptions concerning governance, including specific facts related to institutional trends and perceptions that “internal governance arrangements have become so cumbersome that timely decisions are difficult to make”.  The AGB statement then defines general principles upon which governing boards are to operate and the responsibilities of a governing board to the institution; the updated principles as of 2010 are below.

 The ultimate responsibility for governance of the institution (or system) rests in its governing board.
 The board should establish effective ways to govern while respecting the culture of decision making in the academy.
 The board should approve a budget and establish guidelines for resource allocation using a process that reflects strategic priorities.
 Boards should ensure open communication with campus constituencies.
 The governing board should manifest a commitment to accountability and transparency and should exemplify the behavior it expects of other participants in the governance process.
 Governing boards have the ultimate responsibility to appoint and assess the performance of the president.
 System governing boards should clarify the authority and responsibilities of the system head, campus heads, and any institutional quasi-governing or advisory boards.
 Boards of both public and independent colleges and universities should play an important role in relating their institutions to the communities they serve.

With their statement on governing bodies, the AGB then provides statement on governing in the public trust, iterating many of the same points concerning recent external pressures.  The statement defines the historic role and rationale behind the principles of citizen governance upon which state institutional boards operate.  Again, addressing the nature of external influences in university governance, the AGB defines specific principles in maintaining accountability and autonomy in the public trust, including
 the primacy of the board over individual members;
 the importance of institutional missions;
 respecting the board as both buffer and bridge;
 exhibiting exemplary public behaviour; and
 keeping academic freedom central.

In conclusion, the statement asks for the reaffirmation of a commitment to citizen governance to maintain the balanced and independent governance of institutions.

2001 Kaplan Survey on higher education governance

Sponsored by the AAUP and the American Conference of Academic Deans, the 2001 Survey of Higher Education Governance is a study done by Gabriel Kaplan, a doctoral student at Harvard University interested in replicating research done by Committee T of the AAUP thirty years previously.  The findings of the report detail the method with summary of the present state of shared governance. The findings include the state of the locus of authority and reforms as well as the analysis of the challenges facing Liberal Arts Colleges with the pressures of the current economic climate.  The preliminary results contain the raw data on the landscape of governance in higher education from a population of 1303 4-year institutions in the United States, with data compiled from both administrative structures and the faculty.  The survey did not include participation from any population of students.

Shared governance and Jesuit Catholic universities

Since the 1819 U.S. Supreme Court case Dartmouth College v. Woodward before the Yale Report of 1828 (where the former was catalyst from the later, each of which upheld the separation of church and state) private universities in the United States generally maintain remarkable autonomy from local, state, and federal government.  Questions might be raised over the role of shared governance in private education.  In Conversations on Jesuit Higher Education, Quinn and Moore (2005) support values of shared governance in Jesuit Universities.  Quinn notes the way in which Catholic colleges and universities adopted principles of shared governance throughout the 1960s.  Moore begins by noting that the concept of shared governance is often viewed as inefficient in the corporate world. The author believes that shared governance is not a cumbersome system of management, but necessary given the organizational dynamics and complexities of university systems.

By contrast to corporate trends, the author maintains that the corporate “one-size-fits-all” system could not effectively suit institutional needs.  From which, the perspective then affirms the AAUP tradition of shared governance as a sound system of organization and management in higher education, “essential to the long term interests of colleges and universities if they wish to remain competitive and academically credible”.  The way in which shared governance is realized in Catholic colleges and universities does vary from institution to institution.  In Jesuit institutions, when serving the role of a board member an individual of the formal order provides guidance on the philosophy of Jesuit education while facilitating “the mutuality so essential for shared governance before the law and in reality,” respecting Catholic traditions with a democratic spirit of institutional governance.

Australia
In October 2003, the Australian Vice-Chancellors’ Committee (AVCC), the council of Australia’s university presidents, put forward a “Chancellors and AVCC statement on university governance."  Given national and institutional debates over the governance of tertiary education, the statement acknowledges the opportunities with developments in management and governing structures.  The statement notes the role of the “business model” that has been advanced alongside the traditional models of governance in Australia.  With reference to additional “third models” in introducing a discussion of the existing frameworks for the governance of tertiary education, the statement defines the legal autonomy of institutions and independence from external stakeholders.  Acknowledging the diversity of governing structures and believing a balance is necessary between internal and external forces, the organization maintains:  “No single way to achieve an effective governance arrangement” is possible.  In recognizing the differences in institutional structures and frames of reference, the statement offers operational good practices as generic principles and recommendations, also identifying national protocols for the success of Australian higher education.

The recommendations address practices by which internal governing structures operate and how they can improve institutional governance for the Commonwealth of Australia.  External relations, the role of faculty and students in governance are not approached except inasmuch as institutional board members should be appointed with their selection based on contributions “to the effective working of the governing body by having needed skills, knowledge and experience, an appreciation of the values of a university and its core activities of teaching and research, its independence and academic freedom and the capacity to appreciate the university’s external community needs from that university”.  The committee defines the responsibilities of university governance, including legal obligations and legislative requirements for the internal governing boards of Australian institutions.  Accordingly, governing bodies “should make available a programme of induction and professional development . . . to ensure that all members are aware of the nature of their duties and responsibilities”.  The report concludes with protocol for annual reports, including report of risk management and additional steps to ensure good governance.

Africa
The Pan-African Institute of University Governance is a project set up by the Agence Universitaire de la Francophonie and by the Association of Commonwealth universities, in support of the Ministry of the higher education of Cameroon. It was launched during the World Conference on the Higher education of the UNESCO which was held in Paris from 5 to 8 July 2009, by the Rector of the AUF, Mr Bernard Cerquiglini, and the General Secretary of the ACU Mr John Tarrant.

Based physically at the Yaounde - Cameroon, it is about a unique structure of support which aims at improving all the practices which contribute to the smooth running of higher education in Africa. Its vocation is to accompany the modernization of the governance of higher education thanks to the implementation of expertise, the modules of training, seminars and workshops and especially specific tools of management, analysis and evaluation. It spreads his actions on the whole domain of governance (academic, administrative, financial, social, numerical and of the research) and has a function of observatory of higher education in Africa.

At this effect, the Institute founds its methods of work on its role of observatory of higher education, on its expertise in evaluation of mechanisms of functioning and decision-making in establishments, and thus on its capacity of analysis of the modes and tools of management of higher education.

The Institute’s action is founded around five major challenges:
a challenge of efficiency to develop the universities’ practices of governance and make them real actors of the development. 
a technical challenge to help universities rationalize their means and realize in best their missions
a strategic challenge by the pooling of tools and the exchange of the good practices
an African challenge to realize an African community of higher education which transcends the language and political barriers
a political challenge through its network of partners and experts.

The activities of the Institute in 2009–2010 are articulate around three types of actions:
the effective launch of the Institute
the knowledge of the mechanisms of university governance through two inquiries
initiatives of training, information and promotion.

The Institute works in partnership with stakeholders and international institutions to accompany initiatives and realize actions which can contribute to the improvement of the functioning of higher education and more widely education in Africa.

The philosophy of this Institute expands dialogue and shared experience between African university leaders on issues related to university governance. Methods will step out from the classical models of cooperation in which the "expertise" of the North are transmitted to “addressee” and “consignee” of the South, leading to the principals and attitudes of copy-write. African Universities can only develop if they succeed in inventing their own policies and procedures, all by taking into consideration international standards.

To assist universities in the accomplishment of their missions in an efficient and modern way, the Pan-African Institute of University Governance shall make use of the relationship it has with partners such as the Agence universitaire de la Francophonie (AUF) and the Association of Commonwealth Universities (ACU).

The AUF-ACU partnership consists of two joined visions. Rounding on common objectives and shared missions, Anglophones, Francophones, Lusophones and Arabic-speakers will better enrich discussions on how to develop higher educational system. This illustrates the importance taken by cultural diversity in the World today, being an essential basis for development inside more harmonized globalization which takes into account each person’s identity and values. Therefore, our approach is that of the exchange of experience and good practices likely to be widespread within the framework of our institutions that most frequently lack real communication.

About governance : Two approaches shall enable us to tackle the problems of higher education institutions’ governance in Africa. The first one is current. It consists of rationalizing, valorizing and modernizing both the university foundations and their various systems of functioning. It supposes to put on better the whole university structure : better management, transparency in the decision-making and the participation of all actors in the decision-making. The second approach of governance fundamentally questions the efficiency of the systems of functioning of universities, too much centered on the hierarchical authority of the State, and on that of the university and academic administration, whether it is to define the financing, programs, the qualifications and even the courses of training. The governance of higher education will succeed only if it allows creating a common space of meeting between the actors : political, socioeconomic, students, teaching and civil society.
Web site : www.ipagu.org

South Africa

South Africa faces issues related to the governance of their tertiary system of higher education that correlate with international trends.  Hall and Symes (2005) discuss the state of South African higher education in the first decade of the country’s constitutional democracy at a time when the country has faced not only democratic transition but also the end of Apartheid racial segregation.  With the South African transition to democracy in 1994, the national government and institutions of postsecondary learning envisioned the cooperative governance of higher education.  For a developing country that faced “massive social exclusion” for the better part of a century – only to be challenged in the 1970s and 1980s –  traditional models for governance in higher education, European and North American models of institutional autonomy are not entirely applicable to the South African context.  The authors discuss the need for government “steering,” an idea originally envisioned in South Africa with the democratic transition, based upon a cooperative framework as a “conditional autonomy.”  The goals and objectives for cooperative governance were thus established with the National Commission on Higher Education (NCHE) in 1994, detailed in its 1996 report.

The South African National Commission on Higher Education was meant to serve as a “buffer mechanism” between government and institutions to establish a system by which “autonomous higher education institutions would work in a range of partnerships with government and other stakeholders,” from the involvement of state supervision and consultation.   Within the initial years of the democratic transition and the end of the Apartheid, Hall and Symes (2005) note that the national government assumed a much stronger regulatory and bureaucratic control of South African postsecondary institutions than what had been originally expected.  From the appointments to the National Commission on Higher Education, the 1997 Higher Education Act, and the 2001 National Plan for Higher Education, the national government has assumed direct command of curriculum, funding and regulation over institutions with “weak or non-existent traditions of academic freedom”.

Where the 1997 Higher Education Act and ministerial appointments provided the framework by which the national government could assert control over postsecondary institutions, the 2001 Education Amendment Act and white paper expressed the government’s motivations to take a strong position of power in the governance of South African higher education.  Whereby, the “period from the 1997 White Paper to the 2001 National Plan for Higher Education has seen a systematic tightening of state control and the erosion of both the procedural and substantive autonomy of individual institutions”.   Furthermore, Hall and Symes note that while the ten universities reserved for white students during the apartheid maintained substantial autonomy, other institutions such as technical schools and “branches of the racially defined government bureaucracy,” continued to be governed by tight government intervention.   The authors do not reject the need for government “steering,” and cooperative governance with the national government for the developing country.  Nonetheless, where the concept of conditional autonomy remained vague with its vision in 1996, the authors suggest that given the direction the government and NCHE have taken, there need be a rethinking of the relationship between institutions and the newly established democratic government.

Other European countries
Institutions of tertiary higher education in Europe have been under reform, following the common goals and objectives to develop new models for institutional governance.  Sporn, writing for EDUCAUSE, discusses the restructuring of higher education with “notions of new public management", which the author correlates to neoliberal economic models.  The author directly relates these currents in the management of European higher education with the influence of U.S. models for approaching change in higher education. The European countries of Norway and Sweden are provided as additional examples of the new managerialism in tertiary education.  In both Norway and Sweden, each have emphasized restructuring based on in vogue international trends with different approaches to reform that are characterized as common to continental Europe.  New organizational forms for governance and leadership with the diversification of higher education have emphasized maintaining institutional autonomy, harmonizing institutional standards, and expanding higher education with goals related to the neoliberal market model of education.  Stressing quality of learning and leadership within higher education, restructuring by way of the key catchphrases such as accountability, changing management in Europe also includes providing for human resource goals such as staff development.

Significant among these changes is the establishment of governing and coordinating boards with decision-making structures for collaboration in external and internal governance of higher education (as done in many states within the United States).  Believing that there will be either a convergence or divergence between a strong administrative managerialism and faculty involvement in governance throughout Europe, the UK and U.S., the example of the system in Austria illustrates the potential for innovative approaches that grant autonomy to institutions with restructuring through an external board.  In conclusion, Sporn believes the new governing structures provide stronger leadership and management, but that institutions "should pay close attention to the role of faculty and shared governance."

United Kingdom

Changes in the United Kingdom’s system of higher education are given as examples of neoliberal economic models.  Increased managerialism with economic privatization and minimizing internal governing structures are common themes in the restructuring of UK higher education, which entails the “erosion of the power of unions and professionals and the increased importance of managers and nonexecutive, nonelected directors.  In general, the new managerialism in Europe involves four different trends:

 Efficiency in finances with stronger managerial controls and deregulation of the labor market, i.e. the Efficiency Drive.
 Downsizing and Decentralization, breaking up large institutions into smaller peripherary units with a small centralized managerial core and a split between public and private funding.
 Excellence, the In Search For Excellence Model, which focuses on a more human resource approach to institutional change with a mix of top-down and bottom-up organization
 Public Service, with the merging of both public and private managerial practices.

See also
 Policy governance
 Comparative education
 Educational leadership
 International education
 Post-secondary educational organizations
 Students' union

Notes

References
 Birnbaum, R. 1991. How Colleges Work. San Francisco: Jossey-Bass.
 Butts, R.F. 1955. A Cultural History of Western Education; its social and intellectual foundations. New York: McGraw-Hill.
 Dobbins, Michael and Jens Jungblut. "Higher Education Governance." Oxford Bibliographies. 29 November 2018. DOI: 10.1093/obo/9780199756810-0203
 Heller, D.E., (Ed.). 2001. The States and Public Higher Education Policy.  Baltimore:  The Johns Hopkins University Press.
 Kaplin, W.A. & Lee, B.A. 1995. The Law of Higher Education:  A Comprehensive Guide to Legal Implications of Administrative Decision Making, (3rd Ed.). San Francisco:  Jossey Bass Publishers. (For UK law, see Farrington, D.J. & Palfreyman, D. (2012) 'The Law of Higher Education' (2nd Ed.)(Oxford University Press), as updated on-line and as supported by an on-line 'HE Casebook' at the OxCHEPS website, www.oxcheps.new.ox.ac.uk - also at the Resources page of that website see the reference to Shattock, M.L. (2008) 'Managing Good Governance in Higher Education' in the Open University Press 'Managing Universities and Colleges' series.)
 Leadership and Governance in Higher Education. Handbook for Decision-makers and Administrators. 2011. Raabe Academic Publishers. http://www.lg-handbook.info
 Middlehurst, R. 2004. “Changing Internal Governance: A Discussion of Leadership Roles and Management Structures in UK Universities.” Higher Education Quarterly, Vol. 58, No. 4: 258-279.
 Mingle, J.R. & Epper, R.M. 1997. "State Coordination and Planning in an Age of Entrepreneurship." In Goodchild, Lovell, Hines, & Gill, (Eds.). Public Policy and Higher Education, Boston, MA:  Pearson Custom Publishing.
 Revitt, E. & Luyk, S. 2015. "Library Councils and Governance in Canadian University Libraries: A Critical Review." Canadian Journal of Academic Librarianship, Vol 1, No. 1: 60-79. Available online: .
 Rudolph, F. 1990 [1962]. The American College and University:  A History. Athens and London:  The university of Georgia Press.
 UNESCO. (2004). "Managerialism and Evaluation in Higher Education." UNESCO Forum Occasional Papers Series No. 7. Paris: Author. Available online .

External links
 Why is Higher Education Board Governance Important? Dr. Drumm McNaughton
 Excellence in Governance Victorian TAFE Association
 Resources on Governance, AAUP

Educational administration
Higher education
University governance